Desmobathrinae is a subfamily of the moth family Geometridae described by Edward Meyrick in 1886.

Recognized genera
Tribe Desmobathrini
 Alex Walker, 1863
 Antozola Herbulot, 1992
 Apatadelpha Prout, 1910
 Brachytrita Swinhoe, 1904
 Caledophia Holloway, 1979
 Callipotnia Warren, 1899
 Celerena Walker, 1862
 Conolophia Warren, 1894
 Derambila Walker, 1863
 Derxena Walker, 1866
 Dolerophyle Warren, 1894
 Dolichoneura Warren, 1894
 Encryphia Turner, 1904
 Foveabathra Holloway, 1996
 Leptoctenopsis Warren, 1895
 Noreia Walker, 1861
 Ophiogramma Hübner, 1831
 Ozola Walker, 1861
 Panagropsis Warren, 1894

Tribe Eumeleini
 Eumelea Duncan [& Westwood], 1841

References

 
Geometridae
Moth subfamilies